The year 1769 in architecture involved some significant events.

Buildings and structures

Buildings

 Second Chinese Pavilion at Drottningholm in Sweden, designed by Carl Fredrik Adelcrantz, is completed
 Blackfriars Bridge in London, designed by Robert Mylne, opens to the public (demolished in the 1860s)
 St James' Church in Bath, England, designed by John Palmer of Bath, is completed (begun in 1768)
 Church of St Philip and St James at Mittelstrimmig in the Rhineland, perhaps designed by Paul Stehling, is completed
 St Clement's Church, Moscow is completed
 Work on Syon House, Middlesex, England, to the design of Robert Adam, ceases
 Reconstruction of the Collegiate Church of Saint Michael at Vydubychi Monastery in Kiev to the design of M. I. Yurasov is completed
 Teatro Bibiena (Teatro Scientifico dell'Accademia di Mantova) in Mantua, Lombardy, designed by Antonio Galli Bibiena, is opened

Births
 August 4 – Vasily Stasov, Russian architect (died 1848)

Deaths
 February 25 – Henry Flitcroft, English Palladian architect (born 1697)

References

Architecture
Years in architecture
18th-century architecture